Roger Malcolm Prideaux (born 31 July 1939) is an English former cricketer, who played in three Tests for England from 1968 to 1969.

Life and career
Prideaux was educated at Tonbridge School and Sidney Sussex College, Cambridge. A talented, stroke playing opening batsman, he won blues at Cambridge University from 1958 to 1960, and began his first-class cricket career at Kent.  Moving to Northants, he scored a thousand runs in his first season, formed a powerful opening combination with the pugnacious Colin Milburn and captained the county from 1967 to 1970.  He marked his Test debut in 1968, against Australia at Headingley with a 64, but missed the final Test of the series, at the Oval, with pleurisy.  His absence allowed the selection of Basil D'Oliveira, and the subsequent controversy led to the abandonment of the 1968/9 tour to South Africa, for which Prideaux had been selected. He played in two Tests on tour against Pakistan, but was dropped thereafter.

In 1967, Prideaux was elected as the first chairman of the fledgling Professional Cricketers' Association. Prideaux ended his long career at Sussex, batting in the middle order.  He also played for Orange Free State in the early 1970s, and later emigrated to South Africa.

His former wife Ruth (1930-2016) (née Westbrook) was also involved in international cricket, managing and coaching the England women's cricket team. Under her maiden name, she had earlier played eleven Tests between 1957 and 1963. They are one of the few married couples who have both played Test cricket.

References

1939 births
Living people
England Test cricketers
English cricketers
Cambridge University cricketers
Kent cricketers
Northamptonshire cricketers
Northamptonshire cricket captains
Sussex cricketers
Free State cricketers
Commonwealth XI cricketers
International Cavaliers cricketers
Gentlemen cricketers
North v South cricketers
Marylebone Cricket Club cricketers
Gentlemen of England cricketers
People educated at Tonbridge School
Alumni of Sidney Sussex College, Cambridge
D. H. Robins' XI cricketers
T. N. Pearce's XI cricketers
Young England cricketers